The Quick was a Veteran Era American automobile produced from 1899 to 1900 in Patterson and Newark, New Jersey.

History 
H. M. Quick developed the two-seat runabout over a two-year period.  F. A. Phelps, Jr. developed the horizontal two-cylinder, chain-driven overhead camshaft engine rated at 4 horsepower.    Although in most ways a conventional runabout, it is memorable for being the first American car to use an overhead camshaft unit.

In 1899 production was planned for 1 car per day, but actual production is not known.  In 1900 the Quick Manufacturing Company was set-up to build gasoline engines, a  patented steering device, the Quick bicycle and the Quick automobile.  Burdened by debts, in 1900 the factory was moved from Patterson to Newark. The company sold out to Remington of Ilion, New York in October 1900 - in a deal that was later declared fraudulent.

References

Defunct motor vehicle manufacturers of the United States
Vehicle manufacturing companies established in 1899
Vehicle manufacturing companies disestablished in 1900
Motor vehicle manufacturers based in New Jersey
Veteran vehicles
1890s cars
1900s cars
Cars introduced in 1899